Amal Abdulrahim Othman (born 13 February 1934) is a former Egyptian minister, member of the dissolved National Democratic Party and a former member of the Egyptian People's Assembly (Parliament) from the Dokki district of Giza governorate. She served as Minister of Insurance and Social Affairs in 15 successive ministries from the ministry of Mamdouh Salem's third ministry to the first Kamal al-Ganzouri for about 20 years during the period from 3 February 1977 to 8 July 1997 under the chairmanship of nine different heads of ministry.

Education 
License of Law Cairo University, 1955. Diploma in Criminal Sciences and Masters from Cairo University, 1958

PhD in Criminal Matters, Cairo University, 1964

PhD from the University of Rome, in the idea of the moral professor in comparative law, 1964

Career 
National Democratic Party – Political Bureau

National Council for Women (Egypt)

Professor at the Faculty of Law, Cairo University, and supervised many of the doctoral dissertations and master in the criminal department.

References

External links 

 أبرزهم امال عثمان وحمدي السيد.. قائمة بسبعين نائبا اقرت النقض ببطلان عضويتهم، مصراوي، 25 أبريل 2009م

Egyptian women lawyers
Academic staff of Cairo University
Cairo University alumni
Living people
1934 births
Social affairs ministers of Egypt
Women government ministers of Egypt
20th-century Egyptian women politicians
20th-century Egyptian lawyers
20th-century women lawyers